ApertusVR is an embeddable, open-source (MIT), framework-independent, platform-independent, network-topology-independent, distributed, augmented reality/virtual reality/mixed reality engine.

It is written in C++, with JavaScript and HTTP Rest API (in Node.js). ApertusVR creates a new abstraction layer over the hardware in order to integrate the virtual and augmented reality technologies into any developments or products.

References

External links
 https://github.com/MTASZTAKI/ApertusVR
 http://apertusvr.org/

2016 establishments
Virtual reality
Open-source movement